Pebblin W. Warren (born April 15, 1952) is an American politician. She is a member of the Alabama House of Representatives from the 82nd District, serving since 2005. She is a member of the Democratic party.

References

Living people
Democratic Party members of the Alabama House of Representatives
1952 births
People from Burke County, Georgia
21st-century American politicians